West Poplar Airport, formerly , was located  south of West Poplar, Saskatchewan, Canada.

See also 
 List of airports in Saskatchewan
 List of defunct airports in Canada

References 

Defunct airports in Saskatchewan
Old Post No. 43, Saskatchewan